Tooma River, a perennial stream that has had some of its flow diverted as a result of the Snowy Mountains Scheme, is part of the Murray catchment within the Murray–Darling basin and is located in the Australian Alpine region of New South Wales, Australia.

Course and features
The river rises near Mount Jagungal on the western slopes of the Snowy Mountains and its natural flow drains generally north, then west before turning south, joined by eight tributaries including the Tumbarumba Creek, and reaching its confluence with the Murray River between the villages of Tooma and Tintaldra; descending  over its  course.

The Tooma Reservoir, part of the Snowy Mountains Scheme, captures water in the headwaters of the Tooma River, and diverts some of the water to the Tumut Pondage on the Tumut River, where the water is used to generate electricity in the sequence of hydro-electric power stations along the length of the Tumut River. This diversion results in a transfer of water from the Murray River catchment (which includes the Tooma River), to the Murrumbidgee River catchment (which includes the Tumut River). However, a compensating opposite transfer from the Murrumbidgee to the Murray basins is made using a different part of the Snowy Mountains Scheme.

See also

 List of rivers of New South Wales (L–Z)
 List of rivers of Australia
 Snowy Mountains
 Rivers of New South Wales

References

External links
 
Snowy Flow Response Monitoring and Modelling
The Sydney Morning Herald (NSW : 1842 – 1954). Announcement of the Snowy River Scheme and planned diversion. 15 February 1949.
Snowy Mountains Hydro-electric Agreements Act 1958 No 20

Snowy Mountains Scheme
Rivers of New South Wales
Tributaries of the Murray River